Izabelin may refer to the following places in Poland:
Izabelin, Lublin Voivodeship (east Poland)
Izabelin, Podlaskie Voivodeship (north-east Poland)
Izabelin, Zgierz County in Łódź Voivodeship (central Poland)
Izabelin, Legionowo County in Masovian Voivodeship (east-central Poland)
Izabelin, Mińsk County in Masovian Voivodeship (east-central Poland)
Izabelin, Płock County in Masovian Voivodeship (east-central Poland)
Izabelin, Gmina Kleczew in Greater Poland Voivodeship (west-central Poland)
Izabelin, Gmina Kramsk in Greater Poland Voivodeship (west-central Poland)
Izabelin, Turek County in Greater Poland Voivodeship (west-central Poland)
 Gmina Izabelin, a rural gmina in Warsaw West County, Masovian Voivodeship
 Izabelin, Warsaw West County, the seat of Gmina Izabelin
 Izabelin B, a village within Gmina Izabelin
 Izabelin C, a village within Gmina Izabelin